Tyus is a rural locality (a settlement) in Dobryansky District, Perm Krai, Russia. The population was 19 as of 2010. There are 3 streets.

Geography 
Tyus is located 14 km north of Dobryanka (the district's administrative centre) by road. Zavozhik is the nearest rural locality.

References 

Rural localities in Dobryansky District